Metaphysics is a branch of philosophy concerned with the fundamental nature of being and the world.

Metaphysics may also refer to:
 Metaphysical art, a style of painting created by Giorgio de Chirico
 Metaphysical poets, a type of poetry in 17th-century England
 Metaphysics (Aristotle), one of the principal works of Aristotle
 Metaphysics, Herbert Schwamborn, a Zimbabwean rapper and producer
 Metaphysics: The Lost Atlantic Album, a 1965 album by Hasaan Ibn Ali
 Metaphysics (Duncan Avoid album), a 2004 album
 Metaphysic, singular of metaphysis, a growing area of a bone